Nari may refer to:

People
Given name:
Nari (Korean name), including a list of people with the name
Nari Contractor (born 1934), Indian cricketer
Nari Gandhi (1934–1993), Indian architect
Nari Hira, Indian film producer
Nari Kusakawa, Japanese manga artist
Nari Ward (born 1963), Jamaican artist
Nari (poet), pen name of Kurdish poet Mela Kake Heme (1874–1944)

Surname:
Marcela Nari (1965–2000), Argentine historian

Places
Nari district, Afghanistan
Nari, India, a town
Nari, Purba Bardhaman, a census town in West Bengal, India
Nari, Razavi Khorasan, a village in Razavi Khorasan Province, Iran
Nari, Urmia, a village in West Azerbaijan Province, Iran
Nari, Silvaneh, a village in West Azerbaijan Province, Iran
Nari, Mardan, Pakistan, a village
Nari, Punjab, Pakistan a town in
Na Ri District, a district in Vietnam

Other uses
Nari (son of Loki) or Narfi, a Norse god
Typhoon Nari (disambiguation), three tropical cyclones
Nari (creature), a creature featured in the game Legendary
Local Palestinian namesake for a kind of Jerusalem stone
Nari (magazine), Nepalese monthly women's magazine
Nari (kana), a ligature in Japanese writing
Nari (letter), a letter in various Georgian alphabets
Nari (film), a 1942 Bollywood film
Nari, an archaic Korean honorific used by common people towards people of higher rank

See also
Naree, 1992 Bengali-language book about feminism
Nari-Nari, Indigenous Australian group in the Riverina region of New South Wales